The 2001 ABC Championship for Women is the qualifying tournament for 2002 FIBA World Championship for Women. The tournament was held on Bangkok, Thailand from October 4 to October 11. The championship is divided into two levels: Level I and Level II.

Participating teams

Preliminary round

Level I

Level II – Group A

Level II – Group B

Classification 10th–13th

12th place

10th place

 Lebanon was penalized to the last place.

Classification 6th–9th

Semifinals

8th place

6th place

Final round

Semifinals

3rd place

Final

Final standing

Awards

Most Valuable Player:  Hu Xiatao
Best Playmaker:  Kim Ji-Yoon
Best Rebounder:  Cheng Hui-yun
Best 3-Pointer:  Akemi Okazato
Best Coach:  Gong Luming

References
 Results
 archive.fiba.com
 JABBA

2001 sports events in Bangkok
2001 in women's basketball
women
October 2001 sports events in Asia
2001
B